Fenerbahçe Athletics is the men's and women's athletics section of Fenerbahçe S.K., a major Turkish multi-sport club in Istanbul, Turkey. Fenerbahçe Athletics' homeground are the Dereağzı Facilities in Kadıköy, belonging to the club.

The department was founded in 1913 and is one of the most successful in Turkey, with the men's team having won a record 20 championships in the Turkish Men's Athletics League, amongst others. The women's team won 8 championships in the Women's Athletics League and became runners-up in the European Champion Clubs Cup in 2015.

Fenerbahçe has had some of the greatest Turkish athletes in its ranks, who have granted Turkish sports and the club itself numerous Olympic, European and Worldwide honours.

Honours (Men)

European competitions
 European Champion Clubs Cup
 Runners-up (1): 2019

Domestic competitions
 Turkish Men's Athletics League
 Winners (20) (record): 1987, 1989, 1990, 1991, 1992, 1993, 1994, 1995, 1996, 1997, 1998, 1999, 2001, 2003, 2004, 2005, 2006, 2008, 2009, 2012
 Runners-up (10): 1988, 2000, 2002, 2007, 2010, 2011, 2013, 2014, 2015, 2016
 Turkish Men's Athletics Championship
 Winners (11): 1952, 1953, 1954, 1957, 1959, 1961, 1963, 1965, 1984, 1985, 1987
 Turkish Cross Country Championship
 Winners (15): 1954, 1957, 1959, 1963, 1966, 1967, 1972, 1974, 1979, 1980, 1981, 1982, 1983, 1984, 1985
  Turkish Cross League
 Winners (3): 1989, 1994, 1995
 Turkish Throws League
 Winners (1): 2007
 Istanbul Athletics Championship
 Winners (24) (record): 1939, 1940, 1943, 1944, 1946, 1947, 1948, 1949, 1950, 1952, 1953, 1954, 1955, 1956, 1957, 1959, 1961, 1962, 1964, 1968, 1984, 1985, 1987, 1988
 Istanbul Cross Championship
 Winners (24) (record): 1949, 1951, 1953, 1954, 1955, 1956, 1957, 1959, 1962, 1963, 1965, 1966, 1967, 1968, 1969, 1972, 1974, 1979, 1980, 1981, 1982, 1983, 1984, 1985
 Rose Cup
 Winners (17): 1939, 1940, 1941, 1944, 1946, 1947, 1949, 1950, 1951, 1952, 1953, 1954, 1955, 1956, 1958, 1959, 1960

Honours (Women)

European competitions
 European Champion Clubs Cup
 Runners-up (1): 2015 
 Third place (1): 2016

Domestic competitions
 Turkish Women's Athletics League
 Winners (8): 1995, 1996, 1997, 1999, 2000, 2009, 2014, 2015
 Runners-up (14): 1998, 2001, 2002, 2003, 2004, 2005, 2006, 2007, 2008, 2010, 2011, 2012, 2013, 2016
 Turkish Women's Athletics Championship
 Winners (9): 1958, 1959, 1960, 1961, 1962, 1963, 1964, 1965, 1966
 Turkish Cross League
 Winners (2): 1999, 2001
 Turkish Cross Country Championship
 Winners (1): 1965
 Turkish Throws League
 Winners (1): 2007
 Istanbul Athletics Championship
 Winners (14): 1926, 1956, 1958, 1959, 1960, 1961, 1962, 1963, 1964, 1965, 1966, 1967, 1968, 1970
 Istanbul Cross Championship
 Winners (4): 1958, 1962, 1964, 1965

Current squad

Technical staff

Current squads

Men's squad

Women's squad

Notable athletes
  Halil Akkaş
  Ruhi Sarıalp - first ever track and field athlete from Turkey to win a medal at the Olympics 
  Eşref Apak - hammer throw, 2005 Mediterranean Games gold medalist
   Anzhela Atroshchenko - heptathlon, 2001 Mediterranean Games gold medalist
  Fatih Avan - javelin throw, 2x Mediterranean Games gold medalist
  Youssef Baba - 1500 m, African Champion
  Donovan Bailey - former world record holder in 100 m, 2x Olympic gold medalist in 100 m and 4x100 m relay, 3x World Champion in 100 m and 4x100 m relay
  Jade Bailey
   Selim Bayrak
  Ockert Cilliers - 4x400 m relay, 2008 African Championships gold medalist
  Justin Gatlin - 2004 Olympic Games gold medalist in 100 m, 3x World Champion in 100 m and 200 m, 2x World Indoor Champion in 60 m and 2x IAAF World Relays gold medalist in 4x100 m relay
  Ramil Guliyev - 200 m, World Champion
    Nora Ivanova-Güner - 2001 Mediterranean Games gold medalist in 100 m and 200 m 
  Nimet Karakuş - 100 m, World Junior Championships silver medalist
   Ebru Kavaklıoğlu - 5000 m, 2001 Mediterranean Games gold medalist
  Kemal Koyuncu - 1500 m, 2011 European Athletics Indoor Championships silver medalist
  Yuliya Krevsun - 800 m, 2009 European Team Championships gold medalist
   Karin Melis Mey - long jump, 2009 World Championships bronze medalist
  Ercüment Olgundeniz - discus throw, 2011 European Cup Winter Throwing gold medalist
   Merlene Ottey - 200 m and 4x100 m relay, 3x World Champion and 3x World Indoor Champion
   Tatyana Polnova - pole vaulter, 2003 IAAF World Athletics Final gold medalist
  Ionela Târlea - 400 m hurdles, 2004 Olympic Games silver medalist, 2x European Athletics Championships gold medalist and 1999 IAAF World Indoor Championships gold medalist
  Mehmet Terzi - won the gold medal at the 1979 Mediterranean Games in Split, Yugoslavia and 1983 Mediterranean Games in Casablanca, Morocco for marathon and at the road running  Istanbul, Turkey in 1985 and San Francisco, USA in 1987 after receiving the silver medal in 1978 Paris, France and 1983 Frankfurt, Germany marathons and serves as the president of the Turkish Athletic Federation since 2004
  Nevin Yanıt - 100 m hurdles, European Champion

References

External links
 Fenerbahçe Athletics website 
 Official Fenerbahçe website 

Athletics
Athletics clubs in Turkey
Running clubs in Turkey
Sport in Kadıköy
Fenerbahçe athletes
1918 establishments in the Ottoman Empire